Deric Francis Longden (29 November 1936 – 23 June 2013) was an English writer and autobiographer.

Longden was born in Chesterfield, Derbyshire. He married Diana Hill in 1958 and had two children. After various jobs he took over a small women's lingerie factory, but began writing and broadcasting in the 1970s for programmes like Does He Take Sugar? and Woman's Hour on BBC Radio 4. Most of his work was based on his own experience. His wife Diana's illness, subsequently believed to be a form of myalgic encephalomyelitis, forced him to sell the factory. Afterwards, he worked as a full-time writer, broadcaster and speaker.

The bestselling Diana’s Story, published in 1989, was followed by Lost for Words, The Cat Who Came in from the Cold, I’m a Stranger Here Myself, Enough to Make a Cat Laugh, A Play On Words and Paws in the Proceedings.

Deric Longden's first two books were adapted for television, the first retitled Wide-Eyed and Legless. The second, Lost for Words, was screened in January 1999 and won the Emmy for best foreign drama and a BAFTA for Thora Hird as best actress.

After the death of his first wife Diana in 1985, he married novelist Aileen Armitage in 1990 and they moved to Huddersfield, West Yorkshire.

Deric Longden died of cancer of the oesophagus on 23 June 2013. He was survived by his second wife, children, and granddaughter.

Works
Diana's Story (1989) described life with his rapidly deteriorating wife, who was suffering from an illness that doctors at that time could not understand. The book was adapted for television in 1993 with the release of the TV film Wide-Eyed and Legless, known as The Wedding Gift outside of the UK, starring Julie Walters as Diana Longden, Jim Broadbent as Deric Longden, Sian Thomas as Aileen Armitage and Thora Hird as Deric's mother Annie Longden. Longden co-wrote the script with Jack Rosenthal.
Lost For Words (1991) continued the story of Deric's life, focusing on his eccentric mother as she grapples with old-age, senile-dementia and the effects of several strokes. This was also made into a TV film of the same title in 1999, starring Thora Hird who reprised her role as Annie Longden, whilst the other cast members were replaced. Longden also wrote the script for this. He has a cameo as a voice on an answerphone as does his wife Aileen.

Longden's other books describe life with his near-blind second wife, the novelist Aileen Armitage and their cats:

The Cat Who Came in from the Cold (1991) introduces kitten Thermal.
I'm a Stranger Here Myself''' (1994) concerns Deric and Aileen's move to Huddersfield.Enough to Make a Cat Laugh (1996)A Play on Words (2000) describes the making of the TV movies of Diana's Story and Lost For Words, and Longden's reactions to seeing actors play himself and his mother. He wrote how Thora Hird's performance was so powerfully convincing that his memory ended up confusing the two.Paws in the Proceedings'' (2007)

References

External links
Archive of Deric Longden's official website

1936 births
2013 deaths
Deaths from cancer in England
Deaths from esophageal cancer
English autobiographers
English screenwriters
English male screenwriters
People from Chesterfield, Derbyshire
English male non-fiction writers